Aubrey Morris (born Aubrey Steinberg; 1 June 1926 – 15 July 2015) was a British actor known for his appearances in the films A Clockwork Orange and The Wicker Man.

Early life and career
Morris was one of nine children born to Becky (née Levine) and Morry Steinberg. An elder brother, Wolfe Morris, was also an accomplished actor. His Jewish grandparents were from Kyiv and escaped the Russian pogroms, arriving in London in about 1890. The family moved to Portsmouth at the turn of the 20th century. Aubrey attended Portsmouth Municipal College and RADA. His first stage appearance in 1944 was at the Open Air Theatre, Regent's Park in The Winter's Tale. From 1954 to 1956 he was at The Old Vic and appeared on Broadway.

Film and television
Morris featured in over fifty films; a notable early role was as Thorburn, the oddball pornographer running a Soho bookshop in John Gilling's science fiction thriller The Night Caller (1965). His better known films include Stanley Kubrick's A Clockwork Orange (1971), Woody Allen's Love and Death (1975), Ken Russell's Lisztomania (1975), and Gene Wilder's The Adventure of Sherlock Holmes' Smarter Brother (1977).

He also appeared in many television programmes, his debut being in a BBC production of the comedy Fly Away Peter (1948). Television appearances include The Champions (1968), as Van Velden in episode 2, "The Invisible Man". Although most of his television appearances were in Britain, such as Z-Cars and Lovejoy, he also made some appearances in US productions, such as the Columbo television movie  Ashes to Ashes (1998) and the Dennis Miller horror film Bordello of Blood (1996).

Film 
 The Quare Fellow (1962) – Silvertop
 The Night Caller (1965) – Thorburn
 The Great St Trinian's Train Robbery (1966) – Hutch
 The Sandwich Man (1966) – Cedric, the escapologist
 Up the Junction (1968) – Creely, an estate agent
 If It's Tuesday, This Must Be Belgium (1969) – Harry Dix
 A Clockwork Orange (1971) – P. R. Deltoid
Blood from the Mummy's Tomb (1971) – Doctor Putnam
Go for a Take (1972) – Director
The Wicker Man (1973) – Gravedigger/gardener
 Man About the House (1974) – Lecturer
Love and Death (1975) – Soldier
Lisztomania (1975) – Manager
The Adventure of Sherlock Holmes' Smarter Brother (1977) – Coach Driver
S.O.S. Titanic (1979) – Steward John Hart
Oxford Blues (1984) – Doctor Quentin Boggs 
The Zany Adventures of Robin Hood (1984) – Archbishop
 Lifeforce (1985) – Sir Percy Heseltine
 The Rachel Papers (1989) – Sir Herbert
My Girl 2 (1994) – Alfred Beidermeyer
The Goal Movie (1995) – Dr. Jonah
 Bordello of Blood (1996) – McCutcheon
Bram Stoker's Legend of the Mummy (1998) – Dr. Winchester
 Visioneers (2008) – Old Jeffers

Television 
 Catweazle – Leslie Milton, a theatrical items shop owner
 City Beneath the Sea (1962) – Professor Ludwig Ziebrecken, a meglomaniac who sees himself as the leader of a 'New World Order'
 1981 BBC TV adaptation of The Hitchhiker's Guide to the Galaxy – the dimwitted Golgafrinchan captain who was eternally taking a bath
 Tales from the Crypt (1990) Season 2, Episode 4 "'Til Death" as Freddy 
 Reilly, Ace of Spies – Mendrovovich
Ripping Yarns Episode 6 – Grosvenor, the butler who likes 'the naughty books'
 The Prisoner, episode 8: Dance of the Dead – Town crier
 The Saint – Pebbles
 Thorndyke (1964) – Julius Wicks
 The Avengers – Quince in episode 'Silent Dust' (1965)
 Babylon 5 – Duncan (in "Exogenesis")
 Danger Man – 3 episodes; portraying Mr. Harris in 'Yesterday's Enemies', Fortunato Santos in one episode, Tamasio in another
 The Sweeney – Foreign Gambler, episode: 'Stoppo Driver', his brother Wolfe Morris also appeared in the same episode.
 Space: 1999, episode: Mission of the Darians – Petros High Priest
 Armchair Theatre – 6 episodes, including Joe, the make-up man in "Afternoon of a Nymph" (1962)
 ‘’Ashes to Ashes (Columbo)’’ 1998 - Fred
 Deadwood – Chesterton
 On the Buses – Marriage guidance counsellor
 It's Always Sunny in Philadelphia – Dr. Zimmerman
 Pardon The Expression – Mr. Blenkinsop, 'The Cup That Cheers' (1966)

References

External links

Aubrey Morris (Aveleyman)

1926 births
English male stage actors
English male film actors
English male television actors
Male actors from Portsmouth
English people of Ukrainian-Jewish descent
Jewish English male actors
2015 deaths
20th-century English male actors
21st-century English male actors
Alumni of RADA